Kyle Bruce Garlick (born January 26, 1992) is an American professional baseball outfielder in the Minnesota Twins organization. He made his MLB debut in 2019 for the Los Angeles Dodgers and has also played in Major League Baseball (MLB) for the Philadelphia Phillies. Prior to his professional career, Garlick played college baseball for the Cal Poly Pomona Broncos, where he set the single-season record for home runs.

Amateur career
Garlick graduated from Chino Hills High School in Chino Hills, California. He enrolled at the University of Oregon and played college baseball for the Oregon Ducks for three years. An injury and a family health scare during his junior season led to him putting up sub-par numbers and not being selected for the 2014 MLB draft. He then transferred to California State Polytechnic University, Pomona (Cal Poly Pomona) and played for the Cal Poly Pomona Broncos in 2015. That year, he set the Broncos single-season home run record with his 17th home run, breaking Travis Taijeron's previous record of 16. He finished the year with a .358 batting average and 17 home runs.

Professional career

Los Angeles Dodgers
The Los Angeles Dodgers selected Garlick in the 28th round of the 2015 MLB draft. He received a $1,000 signing bonus from the Dodgers. Garlick played in 60 games across four different levels in 2015, hitting .349. He began the following season with the Rancho Cucamonga Quakes of the Class A-Advanced California League, where he hit three home runs, including an inside the park one, in a game against the Lancaster JetHawks on April 19. In 49 games with the Quakes, he hit .306 with 11 home runs  and 37 runs batted in (RBIs). He was chosen to represent them at the mid-season all-star game, though he was unable to play in the game as a result of a promotion to the Tulsa Drillers of the Double-A Texas League.

In 2017, Garlick was named to the mid-season Texas League all-star game, but missed that game as the result of a hand injury. He hit .239 in 74 games for the Drillers with 17 home runs and 42 RBIs. The next year, he started with Tulsa before an early season promotion to the Oklahoma City Dodgers of the Triple-A Pacific Coast League. Between the two levels, he hit .259 with 22 home runs and 60 RBIs.

The Dodgers promoted Garlick to the major leagues on May 17, 2019. He lined out to left field in his first MLB at-bat, as a pinch hitter on May 19 against the Cincinnati Reds. On June 8, 2019, Garlick recorded his first MLB hit, a pinch-hit double off of Jeff Samardzija of the San Francisco Giants. On June 19, 2019, Garlick hit his first major league home run off of Drew Pomeranz of the San Francisco Giants. He played in 30 games for the Dodgers in 2019, with three home runs, six RBIs, and a .250 batting average. He spent most of the season with Oklahoma City, where he hit .314 in 81 games with 23 homers and 59 RBIs.

On February 10, 2020, Garlick was designated for assignment.

Philadelphia Phillies
On February 15, 2020, Garlick was traded to the Philadelphia Phillies in exchange for Tyler Gilbert. On January 18, 2021, Garlick was designated for assignment by the Phillies.

Atlanta Braves
On January 22, 2021, Garlick was claimed off waivers by the Atlanta Braves. They designated him for assignment on February 5, 2021.

Minnesota Twins
On February 11, 2021, Garlick was claimed off waivers by the Minnesota Twins. After a productive spring training, he earned a spot on the Twins' 2021 Opening Day roster. Garlick was placed on the 60-day injured list on July 24 with a sports hernia. In 36 games with the Twins, Garlick slashed .232/.280/.465 with 5 home runs and 10 RBI. He was outrighted off of the 40-man roster on November 19, 2021.

The Twins promoted Garlick back to the major leagues on April 15, 2022. In 66 games for the Twins, Garlick slashed .233/.284/.433 with career-highs in home runs (9) and RBI (18). Garlick was designated for assignment by the Twins on January 11, 2023, after the team re-signed Carlos Correa. On January 17, Garlick cleared waivers and was sent outright to the Triple-A St. Paul Saints.

Personal life
Garlick's mother, Cary, was diagnosed with breast cancer in 2014.

References

External links

1992 births
Living people
People from La Habra, California
Baseball players from California
Major League Baseball outfielders
Los Angeles Dodgers players
Philadelphia Phillies players
Minnesota Twins players
Oregon Ducks baseball players
Cal Poly Pomona Broncos baseball players
Arizona League Dodgers players
Ogden Raptors players
Great Lakes Loons players
Rancho Cucamonga Quakes players
Tulsa Drillers players
Oklahoma City Dodgers players
21st-century American people
Chino Hills High School alumni
Rochester Honkers players